= Maldives–Nepal relations =

- Maldives: Nepal

Maldives–Nepal relations refer to foreign relations between the Maldives and Nepal.

Maldives–Nepal relations were officially established on 1 August 1980.
